Pavol Barmoš (born 26 June 1981) is a Slovak football defender who currently plays for Hédervári KSE. Barmoš' father, Jozef Barmoš was also a professional footballer.

References

External links
 
 Futbalnet profile

1981 births
Living people
Slovak footballers
Association football defenders
FK Inter Bratislava players
FC DAC 1904 Dunajská Streda players
FK Vėtra players
Slovak Super Liga players
Slovak expatriate footballers
Slovak expatriate sportspeople in Lithuania
Slovak expatriate sportspeople in Austria
Expatriate footballers in Lithuania
Expatriate footballers in Austria